Diceroprocta averyi is a species of cicada in the family Cicadidae. It is found in North America.

References

Further reading

 
 
 

Diceroprocta
Articles created by Qbugbot
Insects described in 1941